Geoffrey Ian Foley (born 11 October 1967) is a former Australian cricketer. He was an all-rounder who played for the Queensland Bulls in Australia between 1989 and 2000, as well as seasons in England.  He was no-balled for throwing by umpire Ross Emerson in a Sheffield Shield match in 1998 against Tasmania.

See also
List of cricketers called for throwing in top-class cricket matches in Australia

References

External links

1967 births
Living people
Queensland cricketers
Cheshire cricketers
Marylebone Cricket Club cricketers
Australian cricketers
Cricketers from Queensland